Brain-derived neurotrophic factor (BDNF), or abrineurin, is a protein that, in humans, is encoded by the BDNF gene. BDNF is a member of the neurotrophin family of growth factors, which are related to the canonical nerve growth factor (NGF), a family which also includes NT-3 and NT-4/NT-5. Neurotrophic factors are found in the brain and the periphery. BDNF was first isolated from a pig brain in 1982 by Yves-Alain Barde and Hans Thoenen.

BDNF activates the TrkB tyrosine kinase receptor.

Function 

BDNF acts on certain neurons of the central nervous system and the peripheral nervous system expressing TrkB, helping to support survival of existing neurons, and encouraging growth and differentiation of new neurons and synapses.  In the brain it is active in the hippocampus, cortex, and basal forebrain—areas vital to learning, memory, and higher thinking. BDNF is also expressed in the retina, kidneys, prostate, motor neurons, and skeletal muscle, and is also found in saliva.

BDNF itself is important for long-term memory.
Although the vast majority of neurons in the mammalian brain are formed prenatally, parts of the adult brain retain the ability to grow new neurons from neural stem cells in a process known as neurogenesis. Neurotrophins are proteins that help to stimulate and control neurogenesis, BDNF being one of the most active.  Mice born without the ability to make BDNF have developmental defects in the brain and sensory nervous system, and usually die soon after birth, suggesting that BDNF plays an important role in normal neural development. Other important neurotrophins structurally related to BDNF include NT-3, NT-4, and NGF.

BDNF is made in the endoplasmic reticulum and secreted from dense-core vesicles. It binds carboxypeptidase E (CPE), and disruption of this binding has been proposed to cause the loss of sorting BDNF into dense-core vesicles. The phenotype for BDNF knockout mice can be severe, including postnatal lethality. Other traits include sensory neuron losses that affect coordination, balance, hearing, taste, and breathing. Knockout mice also exhibit cerebellar abnormalities and an increase in the number of sympathetic neurons.

Certain types of physical exercise have been shown to markedly (threefold) increase BDNF synthesis in the human brain, a phenomenon which is partly responsible for exercise-induced neurogenesis and improvements in cognitive function. Niacin appears to upregulate BDNF and tropomyosin receptor kinase B (TrkB) expression as well.

Mechanism of action 

BDNF binds at least two receptors on the surface of cells that are capable of responding to this growth factor, TrkB (pronounced "Track B") and the LNGFR (for low-affinity nerve growth factor receptor, also known as p75). It may also modulate the activity of various neurotransmitter receptors, including the Alpha-7 nicotinic receptor. BDNF has also been shown to interact with the reelin signaling chain. The expression of reelin by Cajal–Retzius cells goes down during development under the influence of BDNF. The latter also decreases reelin expression in neuronal culture.

TrkB 

The TrkB receptor is encoded by the NTRK2 gene and is member of a receptor family of tyrosine kinases that includes TrkA and TrkC.  TrkB autophosphorylation is dependent upon its ligand-specific association with BDNF, a widely expressed activity-dependent neurotrophic factor that regulates plasticity and is dysregulated following hypoxic injury. The activation of the BDNF-TrkB pathway is important in the development of short-term memory and the growth of neurons.

LNGFR 

The role of the other BDNF receptor, p75, is less clear. While the TrkB receptor interacts with BDNF in a ligand-specific manner, all neurotrophins can interact with the p75 receptor.  When the p75 receptor is activated, it leads to activation of NFkB receptor.  Thus, neurotrophic signaling may trigger apoptosis rather than survival pathways in cells expressing the p75 receptor in the absence of Trk receptors.  Recent studies have revealed a truncated isoform of the TrkB receptor (t-TrkB) may act as a dominant negative to the p75 neurotrophin receptor, inhibiting the activity of p75, and preventing BDNF-mediated cell death.

Expression 

The BDNF protein is encoded by a gene that is also called BDNF, found in humans on chromosome 11.  Structurally, BDNF transcription is controlled by 8 different promoters, each leading to different transcripts containing one of 8 untranslated 5' exons (I to VIII) spliced to the 3' encoding exon.  Promoter IV activity, leading to the translation of exon IV-containing mRNA, is strongly stimulated by calcium and is primarily under the control of a Cre regulatory component, suggesting a putative role for the transcription factor CREB and the source of BDNF's activity-dependent effects .
There are multiple mechanisms through neuronal activity that can increase BDNF exon IV specific expression.  Stimulus-mediated neuronal excitation can lead to NMDA receptor activation, triggering a calcium influx.  Through a protein signaling cascade requiring Erk, CaM KII/IV, PI3K, and PLC, NMDA receptor activation is capable of triggering BDNF exon IV transcription. BDNF exon IV expression also seems capable of further stimulating its own expression through TrkB activation.  BDNF is released from the post-synaptic membrane in an activity-dependent manner, allowing it to act on local TrkB receptors and mediate effects that can leading to signaling cascades also involving Erk and CaM KII/IV.  Both of these pathways probably involve calcium-mediated phosphorylation of CREB at Ser133, thus allowing it to interact with BDNF's Cre regulatory domain and upregulate transcription.  However, NMDA-mediated receptor signaling is probably necessary to trigger the upregulation of BDNF exon IV expression because normally CREB interaction with CRE and the subsequent translation of the BDNF transcript is blocked by of the basic helix-loop-helix transcription factor protein 2 (BHLHB2).  NMDA receptor activation triggers the release of the regulatory inhibitor, allowing for BDNF exon IV upregulation to take place in response to the activity-initiated calcium influx. Activation of Dopamine receptor D5 also promotes expression of BDNF in prefrontal cortex neurons.

Common SNPs in BDNF gene 
BDNF has several known single nucleotide polymorphisms (SNP), including, but not limited to, rs6265, C270T, rs7103411, rs2030324, rs2203877, rs2049045 and rs7124442.  As of 2008, rs6265 is the most investigated SNP of the BDNF gene

Val66Met 
A common SNP in the BDNF gene is rs6265.  This point mutation in the coding sequence, a guanine to adenine switch at position 196, results in an amino acid switch: valine to methionine exchange at codon 66, Val66Met, which is in the prodomain of BDNF. Val66Met is unique to humans.

The mutation interferes with normal translation and intracellular trafficking of BDNF mRNA, as it destabilizes the mRNA and renders it prone to degradation.  The proteins resulting from mRNA that does get translated, are not trafficked and secreted normally, as the amino acid change occurs on the portion of the prodomain where sortilin binds; and sortilin is essential for normal trafficking.

The Val66Met mutation results in a reduction of hippocampal tissue and has since been reported in a high number of individuals with learning and memory disorders, anxiety disorders, major depression, and neurodegenerative diseases such as Alzheimer's and Parkinson's.

A meta-analysis indicates that the BDNF Val66Met variant is not associated with serum BDNF.

Role in synaptic transmission

Glutamatergic signaling 

Glutamate is the brain's major excitatory neurotransmitter and its release can trigger the depolarization of postsynaptic neurons. AMPA and NMDA receptors are two ionotropic glutamate receptors involved in glutamatergic neurotransmission and essential to learning and memory via long-term potentiation.  While AMPA receptor activation leads to depolarization via sodium influx, NMDA receptor activation by rapid successive firing allows calcium influx in addition to sodium.  The calcium influx triggered through NMDA receptors can lead to expression of BDNF, as well as other genes thought to be involved in LTP, dendritogenesis, and synaptic stabilization.

NMDA receptor activity 

NMDA receptor activation is essential to producing the activity-dependent molecular changes involved in the formation of new memories.  Following exposure to an enriched environment, BDNF and NR1 phosphorylation levels are upregulated simultaneously, probably because BDNF is capable of phosphorylating NR1 subunits, in addition to its many other effects. One of the primary ways BDNF can modulate NMDA receptor activity is through phosphorylation and activation of the NMDA receptor one subunit, particularly at the PKC Ser-897 site. The mechanism underlying this activity is dependent upon both ERK and PKC signaling pathways, each acting individually, and all NR1 phosphorylation activity is lost if the TrKB receptor is blocked. PI3 kinase and Akt are also essential in BDNF-induced potentiation of NMDA receptor function and inhibition of either molecule eliminated receptor BDNF can also increase NMDA receptor activity through phosphorylation of the NR2B subunit.  BDNF signaling leads to the autophosphorylation of the intracellular domain of the TrkB receptor (ICD-TrkB).  Upon autophosphorylation, Fyn associates with the pICD-TrkB through its Src homology domain 2 (SH2) and is phosphorylated at its Y416 site. Once activated, Fyn can bind to NR2B through its SH2 domain and mediate phosphorylation of its Tyr-1472 site.  Similar studies have suggested Fyn is also capable of activating NR2A although this was not found in the hippocampus. Thus, BDNF can increase NMDA receptor activity through Fyn activation.  This has been shown to be important for processes such as spatial memory in the hippocampus, demonstrating the therapeutic and functional relevance of BDNF-mediated NMDA receptor activation.

Synapse stability 

In addition to mediating transient effects on NMDAR activation to promote memory-related molecular changes, BDNF should also initiate more stable effects that could be maintained in its absence and not depend on its expression for long term synaptic support.
It was previously mentioned that AMPA receptor expression is essential to learning and memory formation, as these are the components of the synapse that will communicate regularly and maintain the synapse structure and function long after the initial activation of NMDA channels.  BDNF is capable of increasing the mRNA expression of GluR1 and GluR2 through its interaction with the TrkB receptor and promoting the synaptic localization of GluR1 via PKC- and CaMKII-mediated Ser-831 phosphorylation.  It also appears that BDNF is able to influence Gl1 activity through its effects on NMDA receptor activity.  BDNF significantly enhanced the activation of GluR1 through phosphorylation of tyrosine830, an effect that was abolished in either the presence of a specific NR2B antagonist or a trk receptor tyrosine kinase inhibitor. Thus, it appears BDNF can upregulate the expression and synaptic localization of AMPA receptors, as well as enhance their activity through its postsynaptic interactions with the NR2B subunit.  This suggests BDNF is not only capable of initiating synapse formation through its effects on NMDA receptor activity, but it can also support the regular every-day signaling necessary for stable memory function.

GABAergic signaling 

One mechanism through which BDNF appears to maintain elevated levels of neuronal excitation is through preventing GABAergic signaling activities.  While glutamate is the brain's major excitatory neurotransmitter and phosphorylation normally activates receptors, GABA is the brain's primary inhibitory neurotransmitter and phosphorylation of GABAA receptors tend to reduce their activity. Blockading BDNF signaling with a tyrosine kinase inhibitor or a PKC inhibitor in wild type mice produced significant reductions in spontaneous action potential frequencies that were mediated by an increase in the amplitude of GABAergic inhibitory postsynaptic currents (IPSC).  Similar effects could be obtained in BDNF knockout mice, but these effects were reversed by local application of BDNF. 
This suggests BDNF increases excitatory synaptic signaling partly through the post-synaptic suppression of GABAergic signaling by activating PKC through its association with TrkB.  Once activated, PKC can reduce the amplitude of IPSCs through to GABAA receptor phosphorylation and inhibition.  In support of this putative mechanism, activation of PKCε leads to phosphorylation of N-ethylmaleimide-sensitive factor (NSF) at serine 460 and threonine 461, increasing its ATPase activity which downregulates GABAA receptor surface expression and subsequently attenuates inhibitory currents.

Synaptogenesis 

BDNF also enhances synaptogenesis. Synaptogenesis is dependent upon the assembly of new synapses and the disassembly of old synapses by β-adducin. Adducins are membrane-skeletal proteins that cap the growing ends of actin filaments and promote their association with spectrin, another cytoskeletal protein, to create stable and integrated cytoskeletal networks.  Actins have a variety of roles in synaptic functioning.  In pre-synaptic neurons, actins are involved in synaptic vesicle recruitment and vesicle recovery following neurotransmitter release.  In post-synaptic neurons they can influence dendritic spine formation and retraction as well as AMPA receptor insertion and removal. At their C-terminus, adducins possess a myristoylated alanine-rich C kinase substrate (MARCKS) domain which regulates their capping activity.  BDNF can reduce capping activities by upregulating PKC, which can bind to the adducing MRCKS domain, inhibit capping activity, and promote synaptogenesis through dendritic spine growth and disassembly and other activities.

Dendritogenesis 

Local interaction of BDNF with the TrkB receptor on a single dendritic segment is able to stimulate an increase in PSD-95 trafficking to other separate dendrites as well as to the synapses of locally stimulated neurons. PSD-95 localizes the actin-remodeling GTPases, Rac and Rho, to synapses through the binding of its PDZ domain to kalirin, increasing the number and size of spines. Thus, BDNF-induced trafficking of PSD-95 to dendrites stimulates actin remodeling and causes dendritic growth in response to BDNF.

Neurogenesis 

BDNF plays a significant role in neurogenesis.  BDNF can promote protective pathways and inhibit damaging pathways in the NSCs and NPCs that contribute to the brain's neurogenic response by enhancing cell survival.  This becomes especially evident following suppression of TrkB activity.  TrkB inhibition results in a 2–3 fold increase in cortical precursors displaying EGFP-positive condensed apoptotic nuclei and a 2–4 fold increase in cortical precursors that stained immunopositive for cleaved caspase-3.  BDNF can also promote NSC and NPC proliferation through Akt activation and PTEN inactivation.  There have been many in vivo studies demonstrating BDNF is a strong promoter of neuronal differentiation.   Infusion of BDNF into the lateral ventricles doubled the population of newborn neurons in the adult rat olfactory bulb and viral overexpression of BDNF can similarly enhance SVZ neurogenesis.  BDNF might also play a role in NSC/NPC migration.  By stabilizing p35 (CDK5R1), in utero electroporation studies revealed BDNF was able to promote cortical radial migration by ~230% in embryonic rats, an effect which was dependent on the activity of the trkB receptor.

Cognitive function 

Enriched housing provides the opportunity for exercise and exposure to multimodal stimuli.  The increased visual, physical, and cognitive stimulation all translates into more neuronal activity and synaptic communication, which can produce structural or molecular activity-dependent alterations.  Sensory inputs from environmental stimuli are initially processed by the cortex before being transmitted to the hippocampus along an afferent pathway, suggesting the activity-mediated effects of enrichment can be far-reaching within the brain.
BDNF expression is significantly enhanced by environmental enrichment and appears to be the primary source of the ability of environmental enrichments to enhance cognitive processes.  Environmental enrichment enhances synaptogenesis, dendritogenesis, and neurogenesis, leading to improved performance on various learning and memory tasks.  BDNF mediates more pathways involved in these enrichment-induced processes than any other molecule and is strongly regulated by calcium activity making it incredibly sensitive to neuronal activity.

Disease linkage 

Various studies have shown possible links between BDNF and conditions, such as depression, schizophrenia, obsessive-compulsive disorder, Alzheimer's disease, Huntington's disease, Rett syndrome, and dementia, as well as anorexia nervosa and bulimia nervosa.
Increased levels of BDNF can induce a change to an opiate-dependent-like reward state when expressed in the ventral tegmental area in rats.

As of 2002 clinical trials in which BDNF was delivered into the central nervous system (CNS) of humans with various neurodegenerative disease had all failed.

Schizophrenia 

A plethora of recent evidence suggests the linkage between schizophrenia and BDNF.  Given that BDNF is critical for the survival of central nervous system (CNS) and peripheral nervous system (PNS) neurons and synaptogenesis during and even after development, BDNF alterations may play a role in the pathogenesis of schizophrenia.  BDNF has been found within many areas of the brain and plays an important role in supporting the formation of memories.  It has been shown that BDNF mRNA levels are decreased in cortical layers IV and V of the dorsolateral prefrontal cortex of schizophrenic patients, an area that is known to be involved with working memory.  Since patients with schizophrenia often have impairments in working memory, and BDNF mRNA levels have been shown to be decreased in the DLPFC of schizophrenic patients, it is highly likely that BDNF plays some role in the etiology of this neurodevelopmental disorder of the CNS.

Depression 

The neurotrophic hypothesis of depression states that depression is caused by a decrease in the levels of BDNF. Post-mortem studies of depressed individuals have shown significantly lower levels of serum BDNF. It is possible that antidepressants, mainly SSRIs, are able to alleviate depressive symptoms by increasing BDNF levels, leading to higher levels of neural plasticity through the maintenance of new neural branches and synaptic connections.

Exposure to stress and the stress hormone corticosterone has been shown to decrease the expression of BDNF in rats, and, if exposure is persistent, this leads to an eventual atrophy of the hippocampus. Atrophy of the hippocampus and other limbic structures has been shown to take place in humans with chronic depression. In addition, rats bred to be heterozygous for BDNF, therefore reducing its expression, have been observed to exhibit similar hippocampal atrophy. This suggests that an etiological link between the development of depression and BDNF exists. Supporting this, the excitatory neurotransmitter glutamate, voluntary exercise, caloric restriction, intellectual stimulation, and various treatments for depression such as antidepressants increase expression of BDNF in the brain.  There is evidence that antidepressant drugs protect against or reverse hippocampal atrophy.

A recent study shows that downregulation of Nrf2-BDNF-TrkB signaling contributes to the development of post-intracerebral hemorrhage depression and that Nrf2 inducer TP-500 improves depression-like behaviors in this experimental condition.

Alzheimer's disease 
Post mortem analysis has shown lowered levels of BDNF in the brain tissues of people with Alzheimer's disease, although the nature of the connection remains unclear. Studies suggest that neurotrophic factors have a protective role against amyloid beta toxicity.

Epilepsy 
Epilepsy has also been linked with polymorphisms in BDNF. Given BDNF's vital role in the development of the landscape of the brain, there is quite a lot of room for influence on the development of neuropathologies from BDNF. Levels of both BDNF mRNA and BDNF protein are known to be up-regulated in epilepsy. BDNF modulates excitatory and inhibitory synaptic transmission by inhibiting GABAA-receptor-mediated post-synaptic currents. This provides a potential mechanism for the observed up-regulation.

Aging 
BDNF levels appear to be highly regulated throughout the lifetime both in the early developmental stages and in the later stages of life. For example, BDNF appears to be critical for the morphological development such as dendrite orientation and number along with soma size. This is important as neuron morphology is critical in behavioral processes like learning and motor skills development. Research has reported that the interaction between BDNF and TrkB (the receptor to BDNF) is highly important in inducing dendritic growth; some have noted that the phosphorylation of TrkB by another molecule, cdk5 is necessary for this interaction to occur. Thus, high BDNF and active TrkB interaction appears to be necessary during a critical developmental period as it is regulatory in neuron morphology. The inhibition of BDNF signaling has been shown to alter the epigenetic status in hippocampal cells, with a strength increased by age.

Although BDNF is needed in the developmental stages, BDNF levels have been shown to decrease in tissues with aging. Studies using human subjects have  found that hippocampal volume decreases with decreasing plasma levels of BDNF. Although this does not mean BDNF necessarily impacts hippocampal volume, it does suggest there is a relationship that might explain some of the cognitive decline that occurs during aging.

Miscellaneous  

BDNF is a critical mediator of vulnerability to stress, memory of fear/trauma, and stress-related disorders such as post-traumatic stress disorder.

Variants close to the BDNF gene were found to be associated with obesity in two very large genome-wide association studies of body mass index (BMI).

High levels of BDNF and Substance P have been associated with increased itching in eczema.

BDNF is a regulator of drug addiction and psychological dependence.  Animals chronically exposed to drugs of abuse show increased levels of BDNF in the ventral tegmental area (VTA) of the brain, and when BDNF is injected directly into the VTA of rats, the animals act as if they are addicted to and psychologically dependent upon opiates.

BDNF is a short-term promoter, but a long-term inhibitor of pain sensitivity, as a result of its effect as inducer of neuronal differentiation. The polymorphism Thr2Ile may be linked to congenital central hypoventilation syndrome. BDNF and IL-6 might be involved in the pathogenesis of post-chemotherapy cognitive impairment (PCCI, also known as chemo brain) and fatigue.

See also 
 Epigenetics of depression § Brain-derived neurotrophic factor
 Epigenetics of schizophrenia § Methylation of BDNF
 Tropomyosin receptor kinase B § Agonists

References

External links 
 
 
 
 
 

Neurotrophic factors
Peptide hormones
Growth factors
Developmental neuroscience
TrkB agonists